Christopher Myers Luzar (born February 12, 1979) is a former tight end in the NFL. He played for the Jacksonville Jaguars, New York Giants, and the New England Patriots. He was drafted in the fourth round of th 2002 NFL Draft.

References

1979 births
Living people
American football tight ends
Virginia Cavaliers football players
Jacksonville Jaguars players
New York Giants players
New England Patriots players